Elton Taylor (December 5, 1932 – September 26, 1997) was a Canadian football player who played for the Winnipeg Blue Bombers. He previously played for the junior Weston Wildcats.

References

1932 births
1997 deaths
Canadian football running backs
Winnipeg Blue Bombers players
Players of Canadian football from Manitoba
Canadian football people from Winnipeg